Harbor Lights is a 1963 American film directed by Maury Dexter.

It was shot in San Juan, Puerto Rico.

Plot

Cast
Kent Taylor as Dan Crown
Míriam Colón as Gina Rosario
Jeff Morrow as Cardinal

Production
It was the first of a two-picture deal between Míriam Colón and Robert L. Lippert.

References

External links

Review of film at New York Times
Harbor Lights at BFI

1963 films
Films directed by Maury Dexter
American action films
20th Century Fox films
Films shot in Puerto Rico
1960s English-language films
1960s American films